Han Seung-hun (born 11 June 1973) is a South Korean former archer. He competed in the men's individual and team events at the 1992 Summer Olympics.

References

External links
 

1973 births
Living people
South Korean male archers
Olympic archers of South Korea
Archers at the 1992 Summer Olympics
Place of birth missing (living people)
Asian Games medalists in archery
Archers at the 1994 Asian Games
Archers at the 1998 Asian Games
Archers at the 2002 Asian Games
Asian Games gold medalists for South Korea
Medalists at the 1998 Asian Games
Medalists at the 2002 Asian Games
20th-century South Korean people
21st-century South Korean people